Judd Molea (born 23 August 1988) is a Solomon Islands footballer who currently plays for Solomon Warriors in Honiara as a midfielder.

Honours 

Solomon Warriors
Solomon Islands S-League (1): 2014

International career 
Molea played his first international game with the senior national team on 25 August 2007 against American Samoa (12–1) at the 2007 South Pacific Games.

International goals 
As of match played 8 June 2016. Solomon Islands score listed first, score column indicates score after each Molea goal.

References

External links 
 
 
 

1988 births
Living people
Solomon Islands footballers
Solomon Islands international footballers
Association football midfielders
Solomon Warriors F.C. players
Solomon Islands expatriate sportspeople in Fiji
Expatriate footballers in Fiji
Solomon Islands expatriate footballers